Colorado Airport is an airstrip  east of San Clemente, near the village of El Colorado in the Maule Region of Chile.

The area is level around the runway, but there is distant hilly terrain in all quadrants except north.

See also

Transport in Chile
List of airports in Chile

References

External links
OpenStreetMap - Colorado Airport
OurAirports - Colorado Airport
FallingRain - Colorado Airport

Airports in Maule Region